"Only You" is a song by American recording artist CeeLo Green, released by Atlantic Records in January 2013. The song, which features guest vocals from American singer Lauriana Mae, was co-written by Green alongside fellow American singer-songwriter, Skylar Grey. On April 17, 2013, Green and Mae performed "Only You" on The Ellen DeGeneres Show.

References

2013 songs
CeeLo Green songs
Songs written by Skylar Grey
Songs written by CeeLo Green